The 1893 European Rowing Championships were the inaugural European Rowing Championships held on Lake Orta in Italy on 10 and 11 September. The competition was for men only, and the regatta had three boat classes (M1x, M4+, M8+).

Medal summary

The French eight was made up from members of two clubs:
1) Union Nautique de Lyon
2) Émulation Nautique de Boulogne

References

European Rowing Championships
European Rowing Championships
Rowing
Rowing
European Rowing Championships
Rowing competitions in Italy
Sport in Piedmont
Lake Orta